Eucalyptus cuprea, commonly known as the mallee box, is a species of mallee that is endemic to the west coast of Western Australia. It has rough, flaky bark on the base of its trunk, smooth coppery-coloured bark above, lance-shaped adult leaves, flower buds in groups of seven, creamy white flowers and conical to cup-shaped fruit.

Description
Flowering occurs between August and November and the flowers are white or creamy-white.

Taxonomy and naming
Eucalyptus cuprea was first formally described in 1993 by Ian Brooker and Stephen Hopper from a specimen collected by Brooker north of the Murchison River in 1984. The specific epithet (cuprea) is a Latin word meaning "coppery" in reference to the seasonal colour of the smooth bark.

Eucalyptus cuprea belongs in Eucalyptus subgenus Symphyomyrtus section Adnataria (also known as the boxes). Within the Adnataria section, E. cuprea is part of a subgroup, series Buxeales which are all found in south-eastern Australia, with only three occurring in Western Australia, those being E.cuprea , E. absita and E. lucasii. All three have inflexed stamens which separates them from the eastern species.

Distribution and habitat
Mallee box is found in a small area in the Geraldton hills in the Mid West region of Western Australia where it grows in shallow sandy soils over granite. It occurs in almost pure stands.

Conservation status
Eucalyptus cuprea is classified as "endangered" under the Australian Government Environment Protection and Biodiversity Conservation Act 1999 and as "Threatened Flora (Declared Rare Flora — Extant)" by the Department of Environment and Conservation (Western Australia). An Interim Recovery Plan has been prepared. The main threats to the species include farming activities such as grazing by sheep, weed invasion, land clearing, firebreak maintenance and inappropriate fire regimes.

See also
List of Eucalyptus species

References

Eucalypts of Western Australia
cuprea
Myrtales of Australia
Plants described in 1993
Taxa named by Ian Brooker
Taxa named by Stephen Hopper